Mescal Arroyo is an arroyo, a tributary to Ciénega Creek in the Santa Cruz River watershed. Its mouth is at its confluence with Cienega Creek within the Cienega Creek Natural Preserve in Pima County, Arizona.

References

Rivers of Arizona
Rivers of Cochise County, Arizona
Rivers of Pima County, Arizona
Santa Cruz River (Arizona)